Andrés Felipe Quejada Murillo (born 12 November 1985) is a Colombian footballer.

Career

Quejada started his career with América de Cali, before joining Colombian lower league side Deportes Palmira. After that, he played for Chinese second division club Shenyang Zhongze  as well as Sucre, Cortuluá, Deportivo Pereira, and Fortaleza C.E.I.F. in Colombia. From Ecuadorean outfit Orense S.C., he signed for C.D. Águila in El Salvador.

Quejada has never fired from any team and only leaves by his own decision.

References

External links
 Andrés Quejada at Soccerway

Colombian footballers
Living people
Association football defenders
1985 births
Deportivo Pereira footballers
Cortuluá footballers
Fortaleza C.E.I.F. footballers
C.D. Olimpia players
C.D. Águila footballers
People from Jamundí
Sportspeople from Valle del Cauca Department